Rise of the Guardians is a 2012 action-adventure game based on the film of the same name. It is developed by Torus Games and published by D3 Publisher. The game was released on 20 November 2012 in North America and 23 November 2012 in Europe for PlayStation 3, Xbox 360, Wii, Nintendo DS, and Nintendo 3DS, and on 4 December 2012 in North America and 14 December 2012 in Europe for Wii U.

Gameplay 
The player is able to play as Jack Frost with the help of Santa Claus, the Tooth Fairy, the Easter Bunny, and the Sandman as they battle the evil Pitch Black and his Nightmare minions in order to restore world belief in the Guardians.

The game features drop-in/drop-out cooperative play for up to four players, as well as a levelling system that allows the player to unlock greater attacks and special team moves.

Cast
 Kevin Noonchester as Jack Frost
 Fred Tatasciore as North/Santa Claus
 Thomas Bromhead as E. Aster Bunnymund/Easter Bunny
 Danielle Kaplowitz as Tooth/Tooth Fairy
 Fabio Tassone as Pitch/The Bogeyman

Reception
The game received negative reviews from critics with Metacritic giving it a 43/100 for the Xbox 360 version and a 48/100 for the Wii U version.

References 

2012 video games
Action video games
Jack Frost
Wii games
Wii U games
Xbox 360 games
Wii U eShop games
Nintendo DS games
D3 Publisher games
Nintendo 3DS games
PlayStation 3 games
Video games based on films
Video games based on adaptations
Video games about rabbits and hares
Video games developed in Australia
Torus Games games
Multiplayer and single-player video games